Kolumpo is a Malaysian anthology film release in 2013. It is a collection of three multilingual short stories directed by Bront Palarae, Sheikh Munasar, and Rozi Izma. The film is produced by the directors alongside associate producer James Wong under the production company Otto Films SDN BHD.

Set in Kuala Lumpur, the story weaves together the common themes of life, hopes and dreams. The cast includes Sharifah Amani, Azad Jazmin, Ruminah Sidek, Nell Ng, Mano Maniam, Soffi Jikan, Sabri Yunus, Sherry Alhadad, Along Eyzandy, Radhi Khalid and Emely Poon.

Synopsis
Rahul, an Indian immigrant arrives in town to discover that the company that offered him a job has gone out of business. He is helped by a local restaurant owner and begins his life in the city as an illegal immigrant worker.

In Setapak, Gienna is a Chinese woman in her thirties who is constantly avoiding phone calls from her mother. She finds herself spending an afternoon helping a stranger, a senile old lady, who cannot remember where her house is.

In Ampang, Hafidd, a young man, meets a pretty stranger at the KLCC LRT station after they both miss the last train. For someone who has never dated anyone in his life, this is a life-defining moment and his only chance at love.

Together the three stories create a collage of the human connections that give life to the city.

There are hidden messages in each of the three short stories. The first story shows the injustice in life can receive further injustice; the second portrays kindness across racial barriers, despite issues of racism in different levels of the Malaysian society; while the final installment delivers a subtle message: When one opens his mind to see the beauty in life, life can be beautiful.

Cast

Main cast
 Sharifah Amani as Siti Nur Hayy
 Azad Jazmin as Rahul
 Nell Ng as Gienna Chan Mei Hu
 Ruminah Sidek as Nek Wok
 Soffi Jikan as Komang
 Amirul Ariff as Hafidd
 Mano Maniam as Vasu
 Radhi Khalid as Feroz
 Sherry Alhadad as Sherry
 Sabri Yunus as Rahim

Supporting actors
 Amerul Affendi as Amin
 Emely Poon as Joyce
 Jee Kutty as Little One
 Rosnah Mat Aris as Anak Nek Wok
 Azhan Rani as Azhan
 Along Eyzendy as Mat Rempit
 S. Nirmell as Arjun
 Nadia Aqilah as Siti
 Fairuz Fee Tauhid as Nurul
 Prakash Krishna as Ameerdepp
 K.S. Maniam as Boss
 Nigel Kok Yi Jun as Aboy
 Yadiy Taufik as Budak Basikal

Soundtrack
KL Kita - Yuna featuring Qi Razali

References

External links
 OhBulan - https://web.archive.org/web/20130323014019/http://www.ohbulan.com/filem-kolumpo-lancar-video-sokong-60earthhour/
 PerangFielm - http://perangfilem1.blogspot.com/2012/11/akan-datang-mamak-cupcake.html
 YahooNews - http://my.news.yahoo.com/bront-palarae-arah-filem-kolumpo-032100680.html
 XFM - https://archive.today/20130703035613/http://www.xfm.com.my/X-Buzz/Berita-Hiburan/Januari/X-MOVIE--KOLUMPO.aspx
 PerekaCerita - http://www.perekacerita.com/2013/01/filem-kolumpo-ragam-hidup-di-kotaraya.html
 TheStarOnline - http://thestar.com.my/news/story.asp?file=/2013/1/1/nation/12524056&sec=nation
 Wanista - http://www.wanista.com/2012/12/filem-2013-sinopsistrailer-filem-kolumpo-arahan-bront-palarae-lakonan-sharifah-amani-azad-jasmin/

2013 films
Malaysian anthology films
Malay-language films
English-language Malaysian films
Malaysian multilingual films
2013 multilingual films